Oktyabrsky is an urban-type settlement in Vaninsky District, Khabarovsk Krai, Russia. Population: 

The former Postovaya (air base) is located nearby.

References

Notes

Sources

Urban-type settlements in Khabarovsk Krai